The Union Party (Hizb al-Ittihad) is an Egyptian political party made up of former members of the NDP.

References

2011 establishments in Egypt
Nationalist parties in Egypt
Political parties established in 2011
Egyptian nationalist parties